Hemant, is an Indian male given name. It is the namesake of Hemanta, one of the six Indian ecological seasons—Ritu—in northern half of Indian subcontinent, which runs in early winter approximately from November to December. The female version of the name is Haimanti.

Notable people named Hemant include:
Hemant Batra (born 1967), Secretary General of regional legal association SAARCLAW
Hemant Bhagwani
Hemant Birje (born 1965), Indian actor
Hemant Brijwasi, Indian singer
Hemant Chaturvedi, Indian cinematographer
Hemant Chauhan, Gujarati writer and singer specializing in religious and folk songs
Hemant Choudhary, Indian actor
Hemant Divate, Marathi poet, translator and publisher
Hemant Godse, Indian politician
Hemant Gokhale
Hemant Goswami (born 1971), Indian social activist
Hemant Gupta
Hemant Gurung, (born 1958), Bhutanese politician
Hemant Joshi, Indian professor of Mass Communication and Journalism
Hemant Kanitkar (born 1942), Indian former cricketer who played in 2 Tests in 1974
Hemant Kanoria
Hemant Karkare (1954–2008), former chief of the Mumbai Anti-Terrorist Squad
Hemant Katare
Hemant Khandelwal
Hemant Khava
Hemant Kinikar
Hemant Kumar (1920–1989), Indian musician and singer
Hemant Lakhani (born 1935), British Indian convicted for an illegal arms deal
Hemant Lall
Hemant Madhukar, Indian film director and producer
Hemant Mahaur
Hemant Mehta, Indian-American blogger and author
Hemant Mishra, Indian actor
Hemant Mohapatra, Indian poet writing in English
Hemant Pandey, Indian actor and comedian
Hemant Patil, Indian politician
Hemant Rao, Indian artist
Hemant Sharma, Nepalese singer
Hemant Shesh (born 1952), Hindi writer, poet and former Indian civil servant
Hemant Singh (born 1951), the present titular Maharaja Rana of Dholpur
Hemant Singh (cricketer), Indian cricketer
Hemant Soren, Indian politician
Hemant Talwalkar, Indian cricketer

Indian masculine given names